Ihab Makhlouf (born 21 January 1973), also known as Ehab Makhlouf, is a Syrian businessman, a brother of Syrian businessman Rami Makhlouf and maternal cousin of Syrian President Bashar al-Assad.

He is sanctioned by the European Union, US Treasury, and UK Treasury for violence against the civilian population during the Syrian uprisings, and for helping Rami Makhlouf or the Syrian government evade sanctions.

Business activities 
Ihab Makhlouf was the vice chairman of Syriatel, the Syrian mobile phone company owned by his brother Rami Makhlouf. He resigned from Syriatel in 2020 when his brother Rami Makhlouf fell into dispute with the Syrian government, pledging loyalty to the Bashar al-Assad government.

In 2020 the Syrian government awarded Ihab Makhlouf and his partner Kuwaiti businessman and former MP Abdul-Hamid Dashti a contract to operate Syria's duty-free shops.

References 

Living people
1973 births
People named in the Panama Papers
21st-century Syrian businesspeople
Sanctioned due to Syrian civil war
Syrian individuals subject to U.S. Department of the Treasury sanctions
Syrian individuals subject to the European Union sanctions
Syrian individuals subject to United Kingdom sanctions
Syrian oligarchs
Assad family